Vasilis Avramidis (born 8 April 1977) is a professional football defender who plays for Makedonikos F.C. in the Gamma Ethniki.

References

1977 births
Living people
Greek footballers
Footballers from Thessaloniki
Panetolikos F.C. players
Iraklis Thessaloniki F.C. players
A.O. Kerkyra players
Kavala F.C. players
Atromitos F.C. players
Panserraikos F.C. players
Association football defenders